Economic History of Developing Regions is a triannual peer-reviewed academic journal covering the economic history of the developing world. It was established in 1982 as the South African Journal of Economic History, obtaining its current title in 2010. The journal is published by Routledge on behalf of the Economic History Society of Southern Africa (founded in 1980). The editors-in-chief are Alex Klein (University of Kent) and Alfonso Herranz-Loncan (University of Barcelona).

Abstracting and indexing
The journal is abstracted and indexed in:
EBSCO databases
Emerging Sources Citation Index
International Bibliography of the Social Sciences
Scopus

References

External links

Economic History Society of Southern Africa
Journal page at society website

Routledge academic journals
Publications established in 1982
English-language journals
Triannual journals
Economic history journals
Hybrid open access journals